A fragrance wheel, also known as aroma wheel, fragrance circle, perfume wheel or smell wheel, is a circular diagram showing the inferred relationships among olfactory groups based upon similarities and differences in their odor. The groups bordering one another are implied to share common olfactory characteristics. Fragrance wheel is frequently used as a classification tool in oenology and perfumery.

The first example of a fragrance wheel was conceived by Austrian perfumer Paul Jellinek and titled the Odor Effects Diagram, published in the original German edition of his book The Practice of Modern Perfumery (1949). Other notable versions include the Fragrance Circle, developed in 1979 by U. Harder at Haarman & Reimer, the Wine Aroma Wheel, from 1984 by sensory chemist Ann C. Noble, and the Fragrance Wheel, created in 1992 by perfumery taxonomist Michael Edwards.

Fragrance Families and Personality 
Various suggestions have been put forth about the relationship between a person's favorite scent family and their personality. Stephen V. Dowthwaite, founder of PerfumersWorld, claimed that "Our choices in perfume are influenced by [...] the image we want to portray." According to Dowthwaite, very feminine personalities gravitate toward Florals while very masculine personalities prefer the Woody family. Young people tend to like fruity, creamy, and vanilla scents, young adults prefer citrus and metallic scents, and mature adults enjoy heavy white flowers and Chypres. Elegant, sophisticated personalities enjoy aldehydes, powdery notes and leathers, while earthy, practical personalities prefer tobacco, spice and green notes.

Michael Edwards' Fragrance Wheel 
Developed by a perfume expert to help retailers and consumers, Edwards' wheel consists of a primary scent (Woody, Floral, etc.) divided into blended subcategories. Each of the subclasses were in turn divided into Fresh, Crisp, Classical, and Rich compositions. Prior to 2010 Fougère family was placed at the center of this wheel.

In this classification scheme, Chanel No.5, which is traditionally classified as a "Floral Aldehyde" would be located under Soft Floral sub-group, and "Amber" scents would be placed within the Oriental group. As a class, Chypres are more difficult to place since they would be located under parts of the Oriental and Woody families. For instance, Guerlain Mitsouko, which is classically identified as a chypre will be placed under Mossy Woods, but Hermès Rouge, a chypre with more floral character, would be placed under Floral Oriental.
Originally they are:

With the publication of Fragrances of the World 2008, two new sub-groups: Woods and Fruity, have been added to the wheel.

The chart was again modified in 2010, moving the Aromatics Fougere group to between Dry Woods and Citrus to synchronize the chart with recent studies on smell perception.

See also
Perfumes: The Guide
Chypre
Fougère
Gourmand
Wine tasting

References

External links
 The Fragrance Wheel
 Interview with Michael Edwards
 Perfume classification: The Fragrance Wheel
 The Wine Aroma Wheel

Perfumery
Wine